Amigo is the fifth studio album by American country music singer David Ball. It was released in 2001 on the Dualtone Records label. The album produced a hit single in "Riding with Private Malone", which reached number 2 on the Billboard country charts and #36 on the Billboard Hot 100, becoming his first Top 40 hit since "Look What Followed Me Home" in 1995. Despite the success of the lead-off single, however, neither of the two follow-ups — "She Always Talked About Mexico" and "Whenever You Come Back to Me" — charted. The track "Texas Echo" is a re-recording of a song which Ball originally recorded on his 1989 self-titled debut.

Track listing

Personnel 
As listed in liner notes.
 Audrey Ball - background vocals
 David Ball - lead vocals, background vocals, acoustic guitar
 Vince Barranco - drums, percussion
 Chris Carmichael - fiddle
 Dan Frizsell - bass guitar
 Stephen Hill - background vocals
 Randy Khors - background vocals
 Steve Larios - steel guitar, Chromatic harmonica
 Scott Miller - trumpet
 Kim Morrison - background vocals
 Wood Newton - background vocals
 Billy Panda - acoustic guitar, electric guitar
 Kenny Sears - fiddle
 Joe Spivey - fiddle
 Jeff Taylor - piano, accordion

Charts

Weekly charts

Year-end charts

References 

2001 albums
David Ball (country singer) albums
Dualtone Records albums